NE2, or NE-2, or similar may refer to:

 
 Nebraska Highway 2
 New England Interstate Route 2, now U.S. Route 5
 the NE2 postal district, part of the NE postcode area centred on Newcastle upon Tyne
 National Expressway 2 (India)
 Northern Exposure 2, a mix album by Sasha & John Digwee
 a type of neon lamp